Aflatoxin B1 aldehyde reductase member 2 is an enzyme that in humans is encoded by the AKR7A2 gene.

Function 
Aldo-keto reductases, such as AKR7A2, are involved in the detoxification of aldehydes and ketones.[supplied by OMIM]

References

External links

Further reading

EC 1.1.1
Gamma-Hydroxybutyric acid